Antonio Argilés Antón (31 December 1931 – 21 August 1990) was a Spanish footballer. He played for RCD Espanyol during all his career, and he is still the most used player at Espanyol with 301 La Liga games.

Born in Terrassa, Argilés began playing football in the youth system of local side Terrassa FC. In October 1950, he joined RCD Espanyol where he would play as a right-wing defender. Argilés was a fixture in Espanyol's lineup from his debut, featuring for the club in the 1957 Copa del Generalísimo Final. He left the club after it was relegated at the end of the 1961–62 La Liga season. Argilés re-joined Espanyol for the 1963–64 La Liga season, which would be his last year playing professional football.

After he retired from playing, Argilés became a football coach. He managed Espanyol, CF Badalona, Gimnàstic de Tarragona, CE Europa, CE L'Hospitalet and Bufalà.

References

External links
 
 
 RCD Espanyol profile 

1931 births
1990 deaths
Footballers from Terrassa
Spanish footballers
Association football defenders
La Liga players
Terrassa FC footballers
RCD Espanyol footballers
Spain B international footballers
Spanish football managers
La Liga managers
RCD Espanyol managers
CE Manresa managers
Catalonia international footballers
CF Badalona managers
UE Sant Andreu managers
Gimnàstic de Tarragona managers
CE Europa managers
CE L'Hospitalet managers